Daniel Webb may refer to:

 Danny Webb (actor) (born 1958), British television and film actor
 Danny Webb (American actor) (1906–1983)
 Danny Webb (motorcyclist) (born 1991), British motorcycle racer
 Daniel Webb (baseball) (1989–2017), baseball player
 Daniel Webb (footballer) (born 1983)
 Daniel Webb (writer) (1718/19–1798), Irish writer on aesthetics
 Daniel Webb (British Army officer) (died 1771), British Army general
 Dan Webb (born 1989), Australian musician
 Danny Webb, manager and songwriter of the Danleers